Elsner is a German surname. Notable people with the surname include:

Branko Elsner (1929–2012), Slovenian footballer and manager
David Elsner (born 1992), German ice hockey player
Gisela Elsner (1937–1992), German writer
Hannelore Elsner (1942–2019), German actress
James Elsner (born  1959), American atmospheric scientist, geographer, and statistician
Joseph Elsner (disambiguation), multiple people
 Józef Elsner (1769–1854), composer
 Joseph Elsner (architect) (1845–1933), German architect
Luka Elsner (born 1982), Slovenian footballer and manager
Marko Elsner (1960–2020), Slovenian footballer
Rok Elsner (born 1986), Slovenian footballer

German-language surnames
Toponymic surnames